Harpalus babai is a species of ground beetle in the subfamily Harpalinae. It was described by Habu in 1973.

References

babai
Beetles described in 1973